Anatole Bienaimé, born in Amiens, France, on March 10, 1848, and died in the same town on May 25, 1911, was a French architect who has practiced in the Somme and Pas-de-Calais with a large number of achievements in Le Touquet-Paris-Plage.

Biography 
Anatole Jean Bienaimé was born in the suburb of Noyon in Amiens on March 10, 1848 from the marriage of Jules Henri, carpenter, an employee of an architect until at least 1880, and Suzanne Eugènie Pécourt.

Anatole Jean Bienaimé married Augustine Hélène Marie Becker, and they had three children together.

Training 
Anatole Bienaimé studied at the Regional School of Fine Arts in Amiens. For his architecture lessons, he successively studied under Mr. Bernic in Paris, Mr. Herbault and Mr. Pinsard in Amiens.

He has been an architect in Amiens since May 1, 1880 up until his death.

References 

French architects
1848 births
1911 deaths